Jean Ancot (6 July 1799 – 5 June 1829) was a Belgian violinist, pianist and composer.

Life
He was born in Bruges, a son of Jean Ancot (1776-1848) (1776–1848), a composer and teacher. He learned to play the violin and piano from his father, and aged 12 he played in public, playing Viotti's 12th violin concerto and Steibelt's 3rd piano concerto.

In 1817, Ancot was admitted to the Conservatoire de Paris, and studied the piano with Louis-Barthélémy Pradher and composition with Henri-Montan Berton. François-Joseph Fétis wrote: "Endowed with a happier disposition, he could have placed himself at a high rank among the young artists of his time, but strong passions did not let him give all the required rigor to his studies".

He married Caroline Fanny De Grenier in 1822 at Boulogne-sur-Mer. In 1823, he went to London, where he became director and professor of the Athenaeum, and was pianist to the Duchess of Kent. He returned to Belgium in 1825, and in Brussels gave prestigious concerts with his brother , a pianist: they took place at the Belgian court on 21 September 1825, and at the Vauxhall on 11 March 1826. He settled in Boulogne-sur-Mer, where he gave lessons. He died there in 1829.

Compositions
Ancot composed and arranged more than 200 works, published in Paris, London and Germany. They include compositions for violin and/or piano, and orchestral works.

References

1799 births
1829 deaths
Belgian classical violinists
19th-century classical violinists
Belgian classical pianists
19th-century classical pianists
Belgian male classical composers
19th-century classical composers
Musicians from Bruges
Conservatoire de Paris alumni
Male classical pianists
19th-century Belgian male musicians
Male classical violinists